Ferenc Medgyessy (1881 in Debrecen, Hungary – 1958 in Budapest, Hungary) was a Hungarian sculptor and physician. After graduating in medicine he studied art in Paris, later he studied Michelangelo and the Etruscan art in Florence. His art was dominated by folk realism.

External links
Short Biography and works by Ferenc Medgyessy

1881 births
1958 deaths
Hungarian sculptors
Artists from Budapest
Burials at Kerepesi Cemetery
20th-century sculptors